Abolboda is a genus of flowering plants, traditionally and nowadays (Kubitzki system and APG IV) assigned to family Xyridaceae. It is native to South America and to the island of Trinidad, generally on marshy savanna.

 Species
 Abolboda abbreviata Malme - Pará in Brazil
 Abolboda acaulis Maguire - Venezuela, Guyana
 Abolboda acicularis Idrobo & L.B.Sm. - Venezuela, Colombia
 Abolboda americana (Aubl.) Lanj. - Trinidad & Tobago, Colombia, Venezuela, the Guianas, northern Brazil
 Abolboda bella Maguire - Cerro Yapacana in Venezuela
 Abolboda ciliata Maguire & Wurdack - Sierra de la Neblina in Venezuela
 Abolboda dunstervillei Maguire ex Kral - Cerro Avispa in Venezuela
 Abolboda ebracteata Maguire & Wurdack - Venezuela, Colombia
 Abolboda egleri L.B.Sm. & Downs  - Venezuela, Colombia, Pará
 Abolboda × glomerata Maguire  - Venezuela   (A. linearifolia × A. macrostachya)
 Abolboda grandis Griseb. - Venezuela, Colombia, Guyana, Suriname, northwestern Brazil
 Abolboda granularis (Maguire) L.M.Campb. & Kral - Venezuela, Colombia
 Abolboda killipii Lasser - Venezuela, Guyana, Suriname, northwestern Brazil
 Abolboda linearifolia Maguire - State of Amazonas in southern Venezuela
 Abolboda macrostachya Spruce ex Malme - Venezuela, Guyana, Suriname, Brazil
 Abolboda neblinae Maguire - Sierra de la Neblina in Venezuela, northwestern Brazil
 Abolboda paniculata Maguire - Venezuela, northwestern Brazil
 Abolboda poarchon Seub. - Brazil, Paraguay
 Abolboda pulchella Humb. & Bonpl. - Venezuela, Colombia, the Guianas, Brazil
 Abolboda scabrida Kral - Cerro Aracamuni in Venezuela
 Abolboda sprucei Malme - Colombia, State of Amazonas in southern Venezuela
 Abolboda uniflora Maguire - Cerro Duida in Venezuela

 Formerly included
 Abolboda ptaritepuiana Steyerm. (synonym of Orectanthe ptaritepuiana)
 Abolboda sceptrum Oliv. (synonym of Orectanthe sceptrum)

References

Xyridaceae
Poales genera
Neotropical realm flora
Taxa named by Alexander von Humboldt
Taxa named by Aimé Bonpland